National Police Bureau is an institution under Ministry of Interior, Pakistan. The bureau acts as think tank for government in help shape policies for law enforcement agencies and recommending police reforms for the ministry.

The Bureau was established in 1977 as Bureau of Police Research and Development (BPRD) until being renamed in 2004. It is headed by a Director General reporting to the Minister of Interior.

See also
 Ministry of Interior, Pakistan

References

External links
 Website

Pakistan federal departments and agencies
Government agencies established in 1977
1977 establishments in Pakistan